Foraker is an unincorporated community in Magoffin County, Kentucky, United States.  It lies along Kentucky Route 30 south of the city of Salyersville, the county seat of Magoffin County.  Its elevation is 892 feet (272 m).

References

Unincorporated communities in Magoffin County, Kentucky
Unincorporated communities in Kentucky